In Alle Ewigkeit (In All Eternity) is the fourth EP from the German futurepop band Blutengel. Weg Zu Mir is a reworking of a track from their first album Child of Glass, and was released as a preview for Nemesis, their 2016 best of compilation album. A video was released for Kinder der Sterne (Children of the Stars), which featured Meinhard, who released a version of the same song on his album Alchemusic II: Coagula which featured BlutEngel. There are two collaborations with dark-dance act Grenzgænger, and two demos of songs from Monument.

Track listing

Credits
 Music and male vocals: Chris Pohl
 Female vocals: Ulrike Goldmann

References

External links
Musicfolio.com

2015 EPs
Blutengel albums